Katarina Keković (born October 2, 1994) is a Montenegrin fashion model and beauty pageant titleholder who was awarded the title of Miss World Montenegro 2015 and represented her Montenegro at the Miss World 2016 pageant. pageant.
She began her career as a model and TV host.

Personal life

Miss Montenegro 2015
Keković represented Podgorica on September 14, 2015, at the Hotel Palmon Bay in Igalo in the 2015 Miss Montenegro pageant. She was crowned Miss World Montenegro 2015–2016 and competed at the Miss World 2016 pageant.

References

General

External links
Official Miss Montenegro website

Montenegrin beauty pageant winners
1994 births
Living people
Miss World 2016 delegates